Edmond Göldlin (born 3 November 1907, date of death unknown) was a Swiss fencer. He competed in the team épée event at the 1936 Summer Olympics.

References

1907 births
Year of death missing
Swiss male fencers
Olympic fencers of Switzerland
Fencers at the 1936 Summer Olympics